Queen Louise Land is a vast mountainous region located west of Dove Bay, King Frederick VIII Land, northeastern Greenland. Administratively it is part of the Northeast Greenland National Park zone.

Geologically Queen Louise Land is made up of orthogneiss overlain by sedimentary rocks.

History
This remote area was named Dronning Louises Land after Queen Louise of Denmark (1851–1926), wife of King Frederick VIII of Denmark, by the ill-fated 1906–08 Denmark Expedition —the expedition that aimed to map one of the last unknown parts of Greenland. Danish Arctic explorer Alf Trolle claimed that this area had been originally named as Den Store Nanuták —The Big Nunatak.

Queen Louise Land was subsequently visited by the 1912–13 Danish Expedition to Queen Louise Land led by J.P. Koch, as well as the 1952–54 British North Greenland Expedition led by Commander James Simpson.

Geography
Surrounded by ice masses, Queen Louise Land is clearly delimited. It is an extensive area made up of several very large and numerous small nunataks. Its western boundary is the Greenland ice sheet and its eastern limits are the massive Storstrommen and L. Bistrup Brae glaciers. Kap Aage Bertelsen is a small headland at the confluence of the large Storstrømmen and L. Bistrup Bræ glaciers in the east. Dryasdal is a valley seasonally covered with Dryas octopetala flowers. The area of Queen Louise Land is uninhabited.

The main geographic divisions or parts of Queen Louise Land from north to south are:
Ymer Nunatak, a large nunatak located at the northern end, south of the Alabama Nunatak. The Britannia Glacier is between Ymer Nunatak and the northern end of main Queen Louise Land.
Central Queen Louise Land, the main part or Queen Louise Land proper. 
Carlsbergfondet Land, the SW part of Dronning Louise Land, between Borgjøkel and A.B. Drachmann Glacier.
Eventyrfjelde, the southernmost part of Dronning Louise Land, south of A.B. Drachmann Glacier.

Glaciers, ice caps, lakes and rivers

A.B. Drachmann Glacier, located in the southern part.
Ad Astra ice cap (Ad Astra Iskappe), large ice cap in the northern central area.
Admiralty Glacier, in the north of the central part.
Army ice cap, in the central part.
Borgjøkel, a glacier in the central part.
Britannia Glacier, in the north.
Britannia Sø, a lake.
Budolfi Isstrøm, a glacier in the southern part.
Ebbe Gletscher, a glacier in the southern part.
Eigil Sø, a lake.
Ejnar Gletscher, a glacier in the southern part.
Farimagsø, a lake.
Gultop Glacier, in the north.
Hastings Glacier, in the NW.
Kursbræ, a glacier in the southern part.
Metafor Glacier
Pony Glacier
Shell ice cap, small ice cap in the central area. 
Søstersøer, twin lakes.
Strandelv, a river.
Sunderland Gletscher, in the NW.
Suzanne Brae, a branch of Britannia Glacier.
Trefork Glacier, in the central part. 
Trefork Sø, a large lake.
Vedel Sø, a lake.

Mountains, nunataks and cliffs
Many of the mountains and massifs are little glaciated; mountains are generally rounded and rarely craggy. There are numerous cliffs though. The average elevation is around 1,500 m. 

Barrieren (2,200 m)
Bohr Bjerg
Cloos Klippe, a cliff
Curie Klippe, a cliff
Dickens Bjerg
Dannebrogsfjeldene, range east of Revaltoppe
Dronningestolen
Durham Klippe, a cliff
Falkonerklippe, a nunatak
Farvel Nunatak, nunatak group
Fermi Klippe, cliff
Gefiontinder (2,364 m), peak group
Glückstadt Nunatak
Grimm Fjelde, hilly area
Gultop
Gundahl Knold
H.A. Jensen Bjerg
H.C. Andersen Fjelde, hilly area
Helgoland
Henius Nunatak
Hertugen, a dark peak
Hjelmen
Hvalryggen
Juel-Brockdorff Nunatak
Himmerland Hede, a plateau
Kaldbakur, a nunatak
Kap Bellevue
Kap Weinschenck
Kamæleon, a nunatak
Kelvin Klippe, a cliff
Krebs Bjerg
Laub Nunataks, nunatak group
Lembcke Bjerg, a nunatak
Lodlineklippe, a cliff
Monumentet, prominent rocky ridge by Pony Glacier
Morænevolden, moraine ridge
Newton Klippe, a cliff
Olsen Nunataks, nunatak group
Paletten, nunatak group
Poulsen Nunataks, nunatak group
Prins Axel Nunatak
Prinsessen (1,907 m), spectacular ice-covered peak
Prøvestenen, a nunatak
Punktum (2,175 m), a nunatak
Regnbueklippe, a cliff
Revaltoppe (2,317 m), a nunatak
Rutherford Bjerg
Sankt Vitus Bjerg
Savryggen, a nunatak
Splinten, rocky ridge
St. Andrews Klippe, a cliff
Suzanne Nunatak
Syvstjernen, nunatak group
Thomson Klippe, a cliff
Timeglasset, peak with two summits
Trekanten, a nunatak
Vinkelklippe, a cliff
Winston Bjerg
Zebra Klippe, the northern cliff of Juel-Brockdorff Nunatak

Bibliography
Gregson, J. 2001b: Dronning Louise Land, new routes. American Alpine Journal 2001, 258 only.
Peacock, J.D. 1958: Some investigations into the geology and petrography of Dronning Louise Land, N.E. Greenland. Meddelelser om Grønland 157(4), 139 pp.
Trolle, A. 1913: Hydrographical observations from the Danmark Expedition. Meddelelser om Grønland 41(2), 271–426.
Lister, H. and Wyllie, P. J. (1957) The Geomorphology of Dronning Louise Land. Meddelelser om Grønland. Vol.158. No.1. C.A. Reitzel, København.
Spencer Apollonio, Lands That Hold One Spellbound: A Story of East Greenland, 2008
PJ Wyllie, (1956) Ice Recession in Dronning Louise Land, North-east Greenland

See also
List of mountain ranges of Greenland
List of Nunataks#Greenland

References

External links
Dronning Louise Land, North-East Greenland
Captain and Mrs Trolle's Fund in Memory of the Danmark Expedition, 1906–8 - Cambridge Journals

Mountain ranges of Greenland
Nunataks of Greenland